The Groom Wore Spurs is a 1951 American comedy film directed by Richard Whorf and starring Ginger Rogers and Jack Carson.

Plot
Hollywood Singing cowboy Ben Castle (Jack Carson) hires lawyer "A.J." Furnival (Ginger Rogers) to get him out of his gambling debts that he incurred in Las Vegas to Harry Kallen Stanley Ridges. Kallan recognises A.J. as the daughter of a legendary attorney who helped him on several occasions. Castle seduces A.J. into a quick wedding with Kallan forgiving Castle his debts. A.J. discovers that Castle schemed the entire meeting and wedding with the intended result. Encouraged by her roommate Alice (Joan Davis) A.J. decides to get her revenge by living with him. She settles Castle's film contract, then discovers that he is a milquetoast who in real life in unable to ride a horse or sing. Gangsters decide to frame Castle with a murder.

Cast
 Ginger Rogers as "A.J." Furnival
 Jack Carson as Ben Castle
 Joan Davis as Alice Dean
 Stanley Ridges as Harry Kallen
 John Litel as Uncle George
 James Brown as Steve Hall
 Victor Sen Yung as Ignacio
 Mira McKinney as Mrs. Forbes
 Gordon Nelson as Ricky
 George Meader as Bellboy at the Lariat
 Kemp Niver as Killer
 Robert Williams as Jake Harris

Soundtrack
 "No More Wandrin' Around" (Music by Emil Newman, lyrics by Leon Pober)

External links
 
 

1951 films
1951 comedy films
American black-and-white films
American comedy films
1950s satirical films
American satirical films
Films about actors
Films scored by Emil Newman
Universal Pictures films
Films scored by Arthur Lange
1950s English-language films
1950s American films